Hans Gunnarsson (born 1966 in Finspång) is a Swedish novelist, short story writer and screenwriter.

Gunnarsson published his first book, the short story collection Bakom glas in 1996 for which he was awarded the Katapultpriset for that years best literary debut. It was followed by Februari: två berättelser in 1999 which established him as one of Swedens most celebrated short story writers.

In 2003 he published his first novel En jävla vinter. His third novel Någon annanstans i Sverige (2007) was made into a film by Kjell-Åke Andersson. The acclaimed novel All inclusive  (2015) was a major breakthrough and was followed by the psychological thriller Rum för resande in 2016. The novel Nattsida, relating to All inclusive, was published in 2019. In 2021 he returned as a short story writer with the critically acclaimed Bormann i Bromma, for which he was awarded the Aniarapriset. 

Gunnarssons realistic novels and stories has been noted for depicting everyday life with tragicomedy and the absurd. Human shortcomings is a recurring theme in his writing.  

The 2001 film Days Like This is based on Gunnarssons short story Februari. The screenplay, written by Gunnarsson in collabaration with the films director Mikael Håfström, won them a Guldbagge for best screenplay in 2002. His screenwriting also include the Academy Award for Best International Feature Film-nominated Evil (2003), Arn: The Knight Templar (2007) and The King of Ping Pong (2008).

Bibliography
Bakom glas 1996
Februari: två berättelser 1999
En kväll som den här 2001
En jävla vinter 2003
Allt ligger samlat 2005
Någon annanstans i Sverige 2007
Albatross 2009
Försmådd 2012
All inclusive 2015
Rum för resande 2016
Nattsida 2019
Bormann i Bromma 2021

Awards
Katapultpriset 1997, for Bakom glas
Guldbagge for best screenplay 2002, for Days Like This
Aniarapriset 2022, for Bormann i Bromma

References

Swedish novelists
Swedish short story writers
Swedish screenwriters
1966 births

Living people